Wheeler is a census-designated place and unincorporated community in Prentiss County, Mississippi, United States. Its ZIP code is 38880.

It was first named as a CDP in the 2020 Census which listed a population of 274.

Demographics

2020 census

Note: the US Census treats Hispanic/Latino as an ethnic category. This table excludes Latinos from the racial categories and assigns them to a separate category. Hispanics/Latinos can be of any race.

Notes

Unincorporated communities in Prentiss County, Mississippi
Unincorporated communities in Mississippi
Census-designated places in Prentiss County, Mississippi